The Worlds of Science is a series of science book paperbacks by various authors published by Pyramid Books in the 1960s. The series included both reprints of works originally published independently and new works written especially for the series. Prominent contributors included Isaac Asimov and L. Sprague de Camp, among others.

Books in the series include:
 The Human Brain, by John Pfeifer
 Maya, by Charles Gallenkamp
 Nine Planets, by Alan E. Nourse
 Living Earth, by Peter Farb
 Chemistry Creates a New World, by Bernard Jaffe
 The Road to Man, by Herbert Wendt
 Giants of Science, by Philip Cane
 Snakes of the World, by Raymond Ditmars
 The ABC of Physics, by Jerome S. Meyer
 Computers, by Stanley L. Englebardt
 Man and Dolphin, by John C. Lilly
 Kingdom of the Octopus, by Frank W. Lane
 Dinosaurs, by Nicholas Hotton III
 The Story of Weather, by Capt. David C. Holmes, USN
 Fact and Fancy, by Isaac Asimov
 Electronics, by Stanley L. Englebardt
 Conquest of the Moon, by William Hines
 Elephant, by L. Sprague de Camp
 New Worlds of Oceanography, by Captain John E. Long
 New Frontiers in Medicine, by Stanley Englebardt
 The Human Machine, by Harry Moody
 The Borders of Mathematics, by Willy Ley
 Volcanoes and Earthquakes, by Elliott B. Roberts

1960s books
Science books